The Kamboj ( Kamboj,  Kamboj), also Kamboh, is a caste and cultivating community of the larger Punjab region of India and Pakistan, spanning a region from the Sutlej Valley in the north, the Multan in the west and the Karnal area of the Yamuna valley in the east.

Muslim members of the community are called as Kamboh.

By religion, most Kambojs follow Hinduism, with a considerable minority following Sikhism and Islam. The Hindu Kambojs and the Sikh Kambojs are found in the Punjab, Haryana and Jammu regions in India, while most of the Muslim Kambohs are found in the province of Punjab in Pakistan.

See also
Kambojas
Khmer people
Shahbaz Khan Kamboh
Nawab Khair Andesh Khan
Muhammad Saleh Kamboh Lahori
Nawab Khair Andesh Khan Sani
Waqar-ul-Mulk

References

External links

 Kamboj Society - Who are these Kamboj people?

 
Punjabi tribes
Social groups of Uttar Pradesh
Social groups of Haryana
Social groups of Jammu and Kashmir
Social groups of Punjab, India
Social groups of Punjab, Pakistan